Moore Park is a neighbourhood in Toronto, Ontario, Canada. It is one of Toronto's most affluent neighbourhoods. Toronto Life ranked the Rosedale-Moore Park neighbourhood as the best neighbourhood to live in Toronto. It lies along both sides of St. Clair Avenue East between the Vale of Avoca ravine and Moore Park ravine (formerly Spring Valley ravine). The northern boundary is Mount Pleasant Cemetery and the southern the Canadian Pacific Railway tracks.

The neighbourhood takes its name from its developer, John T. Moore. To encourage buyers, he built two bridges in 1891: the original steel bridge on St. Clair over the Vale of Avoca, and the original wooden bridge on Moore Avenue over Spring Valley ravine. He also helped establish railway service to the neighbourhood, overseeing the connection of the area to the Toronto Belt Line Railway, a commuter railway. The development was marketed to the wealthy, and the neighbourhood remains wealthy. Moore Park was annexed by the City of Toronto on December 16, 1912.

Census tract 0125.00 of the 2016 Canadian census covers Moore Park. The neighbourhood’s average income is comparable, if not higher than parts of neighbouring Rosedale.

Education

Public 

 Bennington Heights Elementary School
 Our Lady of Perpetual Help Separate School
 Whitney Jr. Public School

Private 

 Gradale Academy

See also

Loring-Wyle Parkette
Lytton Park

References

Joan C. Kinsella, Historical Walking Tour of Deer Park, Toronto Public Library Board, 1996

External links
Moore Park on torontoneighbourhoods.net

Neighbourhoods in Toronto
Former municipalities in Toronto